Horizon Travel or the Horizon Holiday Group was a British package holiday company which was one of the first ventures in the package holiday market.

Foundation
The company was co-founded by Vladimir Raitz and Lenny Koven on 12 October 1949. The company organised the first mass package holidays abroad with charter flights between Gatwick airport and Corsica in 1950, and organized the first package holiday to Palma in 1952, Lourdes in 1953, and the Costa Brava and Sardinia in 1954. In addition, the amendments made in Montreal to the Convention on International Civil Aviation on 14 June 1954 created the impetus for mass tourism using charter planes to Spain.

In 1974, Horizon was taken over by the Clarksons Travel Group which went bankrupt in August that year.

References

Travel and holiday companies of the United Kingdom
Transport companies established in 1949
Defunct companies of the United Kingdom
1949 establishments in England
British companies disestablished in 1974
1974 disestablishments in England
1974 mergers and acquisitions
British companies established in 1949